Samar's 3rd congressional district was one of the three congressional districts of the Philippines in the province of Samar in existence between 1907 and 1965. It was created under the Philippine Organic Act from former territories of the province. The district was originally composed of the municipalities of Balangiga, Borongan, Dolores, Guiuan, Llorente, Oras, San Julian, Sulat and Taft which now constitute the province of Eastern Samar. It was a single-member district throughout the ten legislatures of the Insular Government of the Philippine Islands from 1907 to 1935, the three legislatures of the Commonwealth of the Philippines from 1935 to 1946, and the first five congresses of the Third Philippine Republic from 1946 to 1965.

The district was represented by a total of eleven representatives throughout its existence. It was abolished in 1965 following the passage of Republic Act No. 4221 which created the province of Eastern Samar. It was last represented by Felipe J. Abrigo of the Nacionalista Party (NP).

Representation history

See also
Legislative districts of Samar

References

Former congressional districts of the Philippines
Politics of Samar (province)
History of Eastern Samar
1907 establishments in the Philippines
1965 disestablishments in the Philippines
Congressional districts of Eastern Visayas
Constituencies established in 1907
Constituencies disestablished in 1965